Take Her Up to Monto is the fourth solo studio album by Irish singer Róisín Murphy. It was released on 8 July 2016 by Play It Again Sam. The album was co-produced with longtime collaborator Eddie Stevens during the same five-week session period that resulted in Murphy's previous album, Hairless Toys (2015).

Background
Take Her Up to Monto was recorded during the same sessions as Murphy's 2015 album Hairless Toys, and included producer and longtime collaborator Eddie Stevens. The title is derived from an Irish folk song of the same name, popularised by The Dubliners in the 1960s, which Murphy's father sang to her as a child. Monto is the nickname of Dublin's old red-light district.

The album's release was preceded by two tracks, "Mastermind" and "Ten Miles High", as well as Murphy's self-directed video for the latter, which was filmed in London. Comparing the album with its predecessor, Murphy stated that "the visual language has changed. Less reference, a more aggressively modern aesthetic. It's about the London that I live in, it's a lot about architecture, it's about building and the future coming, its about here! It's a bit fizzier and more present tense, irreverent, with guerilla filming, montage and crazy shit. I hope it's a realism that makes you feel good about being alive."

Critical reception
Take Her Up to Monto received generally positive reviews from critics. At Metacritic, which assigns a normalised rating out of 100 to reviews from mainstream publications, the album received an average score of 77, based on 21 reviews. Mixmag described the album as "another reminder of why [Murphy] has more charm, chutzpah and ideas than most of her peers put together," calling it "a complex and endlessly enjoyable record." Now described it as "an album of extremes, following its own wandering logic," suggesting "it feels as though she wants to see how much she can reduce her theatrical pop image into something small and seemingly impermanent." In Exclaim!, Anna Alger wrote "Her songs on this record often feel like symphonies, with multiple movements evolving throughout a five-to-seven-minute period."

Track listing

Personnel
Credits adapted from the liner notes of Take Her Up to Monto.

Musicians
 Róisín Murphy – lead vocals ; backing vocals 
 Eddie Stevens – all keyboards, male vocals; programming ; percussion, flutes, guitar ; violin ; floor toms 
 Rhianna Kenny – backing vocals 
 Jodie Scantlebury – backing vocals 
 Rob Mullarkey – bass 
 Dave De Rose – drums ; floor toms 
 Jamie McCredie – guitar 
 Ally McNeil – additional programming

Technical
 Eddie Stevens – production
 Mark Allaway – additional recording 
 Darius van Helfteren – mastering

Artwork
 Róisín Murphy – design, art direction, video concept, video direction
 Ian Anderson – design, art direction
 Ben Wearing – director of photography
 Katie Lambert – video production

Charts

Notes

References

2016 albums
PIAS Recordings albums
Róisín Murphy albums